The historic Abbe Creek School is a one-room schoolhouse museum located one mile west of Mt. Vernon, Iowa, on E48. It is believed to be the oldest standing one room brick schoolhouse in Iowa. The school is located on land claimed by William Abbe, the first white settler in Linn County, Iowa.

History

Community established
Abbe Creek School was first organized in 1844 by pioneer homesteaders: Alison I. Willets; Jesse Holman; and Peter, Henry and Conrad Kepler.  They engaged a carpenter named Lichtenbarger to build the first log school.  The school was first called Sumner School but later it came to be known affectionately as “Little Brick.” Locally, it was called Kepler most likely because many Kepler family members attended.

Construction
Records in the Linn County assessor's office indicate that the present school house was built in 1856 of soft brick thought to have been manufactured locally at Port Stottler brickyard.  The building measures 20 by 26 feet and originally faced north.

Restoration
The doors of Abbe Creek School closed on June 1, 1936, after serving the community for 92 years.  The building was later converted into a private home.  The school and yard were purchased from Mr. and Mrs. Eddie Pitlik in 1963, and on October 25, 1964, the restored schoolhouse was dedicated as a museum.  It is now operated by the Linn County Conservation Board and is open during the summer: June – August, 1 p.m. – 4 p.m. Museum tours are available for groups at request.

Grounds features

Cemetery
Behind it lay the community cemetery called Sugar Grove, where many early residents, including the first wife of William Abbe, Olive, and Zimri Davis (1783–1856, a veteran of the War of 1812) and his wife (a daughter of a Revolutionary War veteran) are buried.  Two American Civil War veterans, Morris Burnett and George Thompson are also buried there.  Many graves date from the 1850s, the earliest visible date is 1847.

Abbe Creek
Also on the grounds is the spring that furnished drinking water for the school.  It is the source of a small feeder stream running into Abbe Creek.  The original tile used to collect water is still in place.  In the winter, the students would skate on the ice of frozen Abbe Creek.  There is a storm cellar set into the hill of the school where students would take shelter in severe weather.

Lincoln Highway
With the grading and paving of the Lincoln Highway in 1925, the school was moved to face the East and the cemetery was isolated from it by the road.  A Lincoln Highway marker still stands on the school grounds.  A few hundred feet southeast of the schoolhouse site is a marker honoring William Abbe as the first settler in Linn County.

Education

Community 

In pioneer times the school served as the center of community life.  It served as a school on weekdays and a church on Sundays.  Occasionally, a circuit reading preacher from Dubuque would hold services.  Once or twice a month the local residents brought their families to sing and practice spelling in the one room school.

Students

Attendance at the school was not required.  The farm work came first and in the time left over, the children went to school.  Children traveled to school on foot or horseback.  Each child was asked to furnish a certain amount of firewood for the school stove.  Children started to attend school when they were four and rarely finished the full eight grades.  If a student did pass their eighth grade examination, they were allowed to carve their initials on the brick exterior of the school.  These carvings are still visible today on every side of the school.  Subjects studied in school included reading (McGuffey Readers), spelling, drawing, penmanship (the Palmer Method), music, geography, arithmetic, U.S. history and grammar.

Teachers
Old school records show that teachers were paid very small salaries.  In the 1870s and 1880s, pay ranged from $20 to $30 a month with no holidays allowed.  The first teacher of Sumner School, William Willcox, probably received less than that.  By 1897, Miss Isabel Cowen, teacher for the winter term, was paid $35 a month and allowed $10 for the care of the schoolhouse.

One infamous Abbe Creek teacher, Professor Hicks, could spit his tobacco juice into a crack of a floorboard near the stove with 80 percent accuracy.

References

External links

 Abbe Creek School Museum - Linn County Conservation Board

History museums in Iowa
One-room schoolhouses in Iowa
Museums in Linn County, Iowa
Education museums in the United States
Defunct schools in Iowa
National Register of Historic Places in Linn County, Iowa
School buildings on the National Register of Historic Places in Iowa
1844 establishments in Iowa Territory